Beacon Island may refer to several places:

Australia
 Beacon Island (Houtman Abrolhos), part of the Houtman Abrolhos off the Western Australian coast

Canada
 Beacon Island (Hudson Strait), Canada, lying off Dorset Island
 Beacon Island  (Ungava Bay), off Cape Naujaat, Canada
 Anguttuaq formerly Beacon Island near Kimmirut, Canada
 Upajjana, formerly Beacon Island, Cumberland Sound, Canada

Seychelles
Sèche Island (Beacon Island), Seychelles

South Africa
 Beacon Island, Plettenberg Bay, South Africa

United States
 Beacon Island, North Carolina, an island that was in the Ocracoke Inlet near Okrakoke Island

See also 
 List of islands by name (B)